Paul Demetrius Graf von Kotzebue (tr. ; 10 August 1801 – 19 April 1884) was a Baltic German statesman and general who was in the service of the Russian Empire. One of 18 children of the famous German dramatist August von Kotzebue, P. D. Kotzebue was most notable for his military career, especially during the Crimean War as he gained a 
reputation as a capable and orderly commander. However, Kotzebue was criticised by Russian historians for being highly Germanophile and had an certain level of condescension toward the Russians since he was German.

In additions to his achievements, he was elevated to count in 1874. He was Governor-General of Novorossiysk-Bessarabia and commander of the Odessa Military District from 1862 to 1874, and also Governor-General of Warsaw and commander of the Warsaw Military District from 1874 to 1880.

That Germans like Kotzebue should hold the highest position in Russian Poland was not strange:
"Germans in Russia were noted for traditional German orderliness, discipline, frugality, and calculation. Germans in high government positions were noted for their efficiency and incorruptibility – both characteristics in sharp contrast with Russian officials."

References 

1801 births
1884 deaths
Military personnel from Berlin
Baltic-German people
Imperial Russian Army generals
Russian military personnel of the Crimean War
Members of the State Council (Russian Empire)
Namestniks of the Kingdom of Poland
Recipients of the Order of St. George of the Third Degree
Governors-General of Novorossiya